Four naval vessels of Japan have been named Kuroshio:
 JDS Kuroshio (SS-501), a submarine of the Japan Maritime Self-Defense Force in 1955

Japan Maritime Self-Defense Force ship names
Japanese Navy ship names